gh3* is a Toronto-based architecture and planning firm founded in 2005 by Pat Hanson. The firm has designed and completed multiple diverse projects including public parks, landscapes, residential housing, commercial, and infrastructure in Canada.

History 
Pat Hanson is a founding partner and a principal architect of gh3*. In 2016, she was honorably mentioned by ArcVision Prize for Women in Architecture. Hanson is a senior adviser for Building Equality in Architecture Toronto (BEAT) that advocates for diversity and women in the design fields. She is a serving member of Toronto Waterfront Design Review Panel, and also lectures on the firm's past projects across Europe and North America, including University of Toronto and University of Waterloo.

gh3 is known for its minimalist aesthetic and public space designs that strive to incorporate architecture, landscape, and urbanism in one. gh3* seeks to integrate design methods to enhance the quality of the experience on-site, and highlight sustainability.

In 2020, gh3* was chosen by Fast Company for their Borden Park Natural Swimming Pool project. The same project received the RAIC Award of Excellence for Innovation in Architecture, and City of Edmonton Urban Design Award of Excellence in 2019. Other significant projects include Borden Park Pavilion, which received the 2018 Governor General's Medal in Architecture, and Windermere Fire Station #31 that received the Canadian Architect Award of Excellence in 2019.

Notable projects

Borden Park Natural Swimming Pool 
Located within the Borden Park, Edmonton AB, this swimming pool project is the first chemical free public outdoor pool built in Canada. The project replaces the existing old technology pool with a new 400 swimmer capacity venue during the summer season. To fit to the Canadian guidelines for public pools, the filtration system was divided into two systems; a biological-mechanical system with wetland and gravel filter, and situ system where zooplankton were used. The technical demands of the filtration system drove this project's concept towards a material oriented concept and the gabion basket stone walls visually connect with the filtration systems. The limestone used within the gabion basket stone walls are locally sourced and define the steel cage, illustrating a visual connection as porous, filter-like façade. The simple flat roof enhances the openness of the pool parameters and create a sense of an open beach. This project embraces planar landscape that is defined by minimalist detailing which creates seamless connection between the pool, the wood decking, and the beach. The Borden Park Natural Swimming Pool was rewarded the 2014 Canadian Architect Award of Excellence and 2019 RAIC Award of Excellence for Innovation in Architecture.

Borden Park Pavilion 

Borden Park Pavilion, awarded by the City of Edmonton, gives homage to this early 20th century amusement park. "Play" as the key concept of the project, the pavilion's form echo's that of a playful qualities of toy drums and merry-go-rounds. By utilizing seamlessly integrated curtain wall façade, the pavilion consists of a floor to ceiling opening that allows for a panoramic view from the interior. This blurs the boundaries of interior and exterior whilst capturing the dynamic seasonal changes all year long. As the amenities are confined to the core of the pavilion, the promenade continues all the way around, allowing for a complete 360 degree view of the park. The Borden Park Pavilion aims to revive the liveliness of the park as Sunday attraction and provide a public space for community engagement and play. This project was rewarded the Governor General's Medal in Architecture in 2018.

Windermere Fire Station #31 
Located by the North Saskatchewan River and the Whitemud Creek Ravine, the Windermere Fire Station mirrors the classic characteristics of a fire station; pitched roof, large fire truck doors and the solid load-bearing walls. gh3 as the lead design architect joined with S2 Architecture as prime consultant, gathered to design a sustainable fire station as per requirements of the City of Edmonton.

The City of Edmonton has taken initiative with this project in sustainability and the requirements were as follows.

 Obtain LEED silver certification
 Require renewable energy equal to 1% of total building energy needs
 40% better energy efficiency than NECB 2011
 40% better Green House Gas emissions than the base line using NECB 2011
 80 kilowatt-hours per square meter per year for heating needs

The Southern face of the pitched roof was cladded with photo voltaic cells for optimal solar energy generation which also finalized the shape of the roof form. Many different initiatives were added like maximizing natural light for reducing energy load, geothermal heating and cooling, and storm water management landscape to maximize the site potential for sustainability. The dark ironspot brick used in the project visually strengthens the discipline within the community and brings character to the facade. The Windermere Fire Station is an innovative and sustainable architecture that represents the trusted civic presence. This project was reward the Canadian Architect Award of Excellence in 2018.

Other Notable Projects 

 Canadian Museum of Inuit Art (Toronto ON | 2007)
 House 60 (Toronto ON | 2010)
 Russell Hill Road (Toronto ON | 2007)
 Trinity College Quadrangle (Toronto ON | 2008)
 Boathouse Studio (Stony Lake ON | 2010)
 Thompson Hotel (Toronto ON | 2013)
 Storm Water Facility (Toronto ON | In progress)
 Scholars' Green Park (Mississauga ON | 2011)
 June Callwood Park (Toronto ON | 2014)
 Borden Park Natural Swimming Experience (Edmonton AB | 2014)
 Castle Downs Park Pavilion (Edmonton AB | 2014)
 Real Time Control Building #3 (Edmonton AB | 2015)
 North East Transit Garage (Edmonton AB | 2019)

Awards and honors 
gh3* has been awarded four Governor General's Medal in Architecture, 6 Canadian Architect Award of Excellence and Merit, 4 OAA Award and an honorable mention. The founding partner and a principal architect, Pat Hanson, was honorably mentioned by ArcVision Prize for Women in Architecture in 2016 and the firm was selected as World's Most Innovative Companies of 2020 in Architecture by Fast Company.

External links 

gh3* official website

References 

Architecture firms of Canada
Companies based in Toronto
Canadian companies established in 2005
Design companies established in 2005